Brian Spillane  (born 26 January 1960) in Cork is a former Irish rugby union international player who played for the Irish national rugby union team. He played as a number eight.
He played for the Ireland team from 1985 to 1989, winning 16 caps and was a member of the Ireland squad at 1987 Rugby World Cup. He made his debut in February 1985 against Scotland and scored a try for Ireland against Canada in the 1987 Rugby World Cup.

Spillane won a Triple Crown and 5 Nations Championship in 1985. He also played inter county football for Limerick and won county championships with Monaleen at all grades.

Personal life
He currently works as a medical doctor. He is married to Brid and they have 5 adult children.

References

External links

1960 births
Living people
Irish rugby union players
Ireland international rugby union players
Sportspeople from Cork (city)
Rugby union players from County Cork
Rugby union number eights